Wadvani is a tehsil in Majalgaon subdivision of Beed district in the Indian state of Maharashtra in Marathwada region.

.

About Wadwani 
Wadwani is Taluka in Beed district. It was designated as Taluka in December 1999 by then Deputy Chief Minister of Maharashtra Gopinath Munde. Taluka covers 40 villages and is smallest Taluka in Beed having 6 Gat (areas) in panchayat samiti and 3 ZP members. 

Wadwani comes under the Majalgaon (Vidhan Sabha constituency). 

Wadwani comes under the beed (loksabha constituency.)

Education
Colleges like Lokmanya Tilak College, Vaishnavi College, ITI College, Sanket Tantra Shikshan are here. School like Maharani Tarabai Vidyalay, Sindfana Vidyalay and shahu vidhyalay are Here. Sant Bhagwanbaba Public School is English school in this city.

Nearby places are:  

Chikhal Beed village approximately 12Km
Rajewadi bandhara 17 km 
Rajewadi city 17 km 
Chardari: Famous Hanuman Temple,
Kotharban: Satavai Devi,
Kanhobachi tekdi, Mainda Mahadev ("OM" look like Mountain),
Khadki: Khandoba Khandoba,
Rui Pimpla: Gorakshnath Mandir.
Raja Harishchandra Pimpri is the only place in India where Raja Harishchandra's Harishchandra temple is situated in this Taluka.
Hanuman's Son Makardhwaj Makardhwaja Temple is in Chinchwan which is 5 km from Wadwani City.

References

Wadwani 

Cities and towns in Beed district
Talukas in Maharashtra
Beed district